Nitryl fluoride, NO2F, is a colourless gas and strong oxidizing agent, which is used as a fluorinating agent and has been proposed as an oxidiser in rocket propellants (though never flown). 

It is a molecular species, not ionic, consistent with its low boiling point. The structure features planar nitrogen with a short N-F bond length of 135 pm.

Preparation
Henri Moissan and Paul Lebeau recorded the preparation of nitryl fluoride in 1905 by the fluorination of nitrogen dioxide. This reaction is highly exothermic, which leads to contaminated products.  The simplest method avoids fluorine gas but uses cobalt(III) fluoride:

NO2 + CoF3 →  NO2F + CoF2

The CoF2 can be regenerated to CoF3. Other methods have been described.

Thermodynamic properties
The thermodynamic properties of this gas were determined by IR and Raman spectroscopy  The standard heat of formation of FNO2 is -19 ± 2 kcal/mol.3
The equilibrium of the unimolecular decomposition of FNO2 lies on the side of the reactants by at least six orders of magnitude at 500 kelvin, and two orders of magnitude at 1000 kelvin.
The homogeneous thermal decomposition cannot be studied at temperatures below 1200 kelvin.
The equilibrium shifts towards the reactants with increasing temperature.
The dissociation energy of 46.0 kcal of the N-F bond in nitryl fluoride is about 18 kcal less than the normal N-F single bond energy. This can be attributed to the “reorganization energy” of the NO2 radical; that is, the NO2 radical in FNO2 is less stable than the free NO2 molecule. Qualitatively speaking, the odd electron “used up” in the N-F bond forms a resonating three-electron bond in free NO2, thus stabilizing the molecule with a gain of 18 kcal.

Reactions
Nitryl fluoride can be used to prepare organic nitro compounds and nitrate esters.

See also
 Nitryl

References

External links
 WebBook page for NO2F
National Pollutant Inventory - Ionic Fluoride and related compounds fact sheet

Oxyfluorides
Fluorinating agents
Nitrogen(V) compounds
Nitrogen oxohalides
Substances discovered in the 1900s